Jimmy Tansey (29 January 1929 – 7 July 2012) was an English professional footballer who played for Everton in the 1950s and Crewe Alexandra in the 1960s.

His grandson, Greg Tansey, is also a footballer and most recently played for St Mirren

Playing career
Liverpool-born Tansey joined local club Everton as a youth team player in 1948, and made his first-team debut in a 2–2 draw against Notts County in 1953. He established himself as a first-team regular in the 1954–55 season, making 39 league appearances. He remained the club's first-choice left back until he was superseded by John Bramwell in the 1958–59 season. He transferred to Crewe Alexandra the following season.

Death
Tansey died on 7 July 2012, aged 83.
His Funeral was at St. Mary’s R.C. Church, Woolton , at 12 noon on Tuesday 17th July 2012.

References

External links

Jimmy Tansey statistics on EvertonFC.com

Footballers from Liverpool
1929 births
2012 deaths
Association football fullbacks
South Liverpool F.C. players
English footballers
Everton F.C. players
Crewe Alexandra F.C. players
English Football League players